The Württemberg T 4 was a class of German, eight-coupled, goods train, tank locomotive operated by the Royal Württemberg State Railways.

When the T 3 locomotives were no longer capable of banking services on the Geislinger Steige, a locomotive was designed that was to develop twice the power. Because no more locomotives were needed for duties on the ramps, only eight were produced, of which five were supplied in 1906 and three in 1909. In their day they were the heaviest eight-coupled locomotives in Germany.

In designing the boiler, special emphasis had been laid on a large steam space and a low-lying firebox crown so that banking could be achieved with refilling with water, which led to a reduction in boiler pressure and a resultant drop in performance.

In order to reduce wear and tear on the tyres and brake shoes during descents, the engines were fitted with Riggenbach counter-pressure brakes.

In 1925 the Deutsche Reichsbahn took over all eight locomotives and grouped them into DRG Class 92.1 in their  numbering plan. After the Second World War they ended up in the Deutsche Bundesbahn, where they were retired between 1946 and 1948 or sold as industrial locomotives.

See also
Royal Württemberg State Railways
List of Württemberg locomotives and railbuses

References

0-8-0T locomotives
T 4
Esslingen locomotives
Standard gauge locomotives of Germany
D n2t locomotives
Freight locomotives